The Diocese of Rift Valley is a central diocese in the Anglican Church of Tanzania: its current bishop is the RT Rev John Daudi Lupaa.

Notes

Anglican Church of Tanzania dioceses
Morogoro